Torbeg is a village on the Isle of Arran in the Firth of Clyde, Scotland.

References

Villages in the Isle of Arran